Busse is a rural locality (a selo) and the administrative center of Petropavlovsky Selsoviet of Svobodnensky District, Amur Oblast, Russia. The population was 505 as of 2018. There are 9 streets.

Geography 
Busse is located on the left bank of the Amur River, 114 km southwest of Svobodny (the district's administrative centre) by road. Zagornaya Selitba is the nearest rural locality.

References 

Rural localities in Svobodnensky District